Aaron Malik Harrison (born October 28, 1994) is an American professional basketball player for Kaohsiung Steelers of the P. League+. He was considered one of the top high school recruits in 2013 and played college basketball for the University of Kentucky alongside his twin brother Andrew.
Harrison played in both the 2013 Jordan Brand Classic, and the 2013 McDonald's All-American Boys Game.

High school career

Harrison was widely regarded as a top five player in the class of 2013 with Andrew Wiggins, Jabari Parker, Julius Randle, and twin brother Andrew. On March 9, 2013, Harrison and his brother, Andrew, helped the Fort Bend Travis Tigers to defeat South Grand Prairie, 46–38 at the Frank Erwin Center on the campus of the University of Texas at Austin to win the Class 5A state title in Texas. They finished #16 in the final ESPN 25 Power Rankings. Fort Bend Travis had lost in the Class 5A state title game the year before to Flower Mound Marcus. He also was the Guy V. Lewis Award winner in 2013

College career
Harrison started at shooting guard in all 40 games for the University of Kentucky during the 2013–14 season, averaging 13.7 points with 42.3% shooting, 35.6% 3-point shooting, and 79% free throw shooting. He scored a career-high 28 points against the Robert Morris Colonials on November 17, 2013 all while shooting a perfect 10-of-10 from the free throw line. On March 30, 2014, Harrison hit a game-winning 3-point field goal versus the Michigan Wolverines in the regional finals of the 2014 NCAA Men's Division I Basketball Tournament. On April 5, 2014, Harrison hit a game-winning 3-point field goal versus the Wisconsin Badgers in the semi-finals of the 2014 NCAA Men's Division I Basketball Tournament. He finished the game with 8 points, all coming in the second half.

On April 25, 2014, Harrison and his brother both announced via Twitter that they would return to play their sophomore years at the University of Kentucky, instead of entering the 2014 NBA draft.

Prior to the start of the 2014–15 season, Harrison was named the preseason SEC Player of the Year.

On April 9, 2015, Harrison declared for the NBA draft, forgoing his final two years of college eligibility. He was joined alongside his twin brother Andrew and fellow Kentucky teammates Karl-Anthony Towns, Willie Cauley-Stein, Trey Lyles, Devin Booker, and Dakari Johnson.

Professional career

Charlotte Hornets (2015–2017)
After going undrafted in the 2015 NBA draft, Harrison joined the Charlotte Hornets for the 2015 NBA Summer League. On July 14, 2015, he signed with the Hornets. He made his NBA debut on November 20, 2015, recording one rebound in two minutes of action against the Philadelphia 76ers. In the Hornets' regular season finale on April 13, 2016, Harrison had a season-best game with six points and five rebounds in a 117–103 win over the Orlando Magic. During his rookie season, using the flexible assignment rule, Harrison received multiple assignments to the Oklahoma City Blue and the Erie BayHawks of the NBA Development League.

Over the first two months of the 2016–17 season, Harrison spent much of his time in the D-League with Charlotte's new affiliate, the Greensboro Swarm. On January 3, 2017, he was waived by the Hornets.

Greensboro Swarm (2017)
On January 15, 2017, Harrison was acquired by the Greensboro Swarm making his debut that day in a 105–95 loss to the Iowa Energy, recording four points, four rebounds and two assists in 17 minutes off the bench.

Delaware 87ers (2017)
On February 3, 2017, Harrison was traded to the Delaware 87ers in exchange for Cat Barber and the returning player rights to Sam Thompson.

Reno Bighorns (2017–2018)
On November 3, 2017, Harrison together with some draft picks was traded to the Reno Bighorns in exchange for returning player rights to Kendall Marshall and Youssou Ndoye and a draft pick.

Dallas Mavericks (2018)
On March 22, 2018, Harrison signed a 10-day contract with the Dallas Mavericks and on March 31, after playing four games, he signed with the Mavericks for the rest of the season. He did not receive a qualifying offer from the Mavericks after the season.

Galatasaray (2018–2020)
On September 5, 2018, Harrison signed with Galatasaray of the Turkish Basketbol Süper Ligi (BSL) and the EuroCup.

On August 7, 2019, Harrison renewed his contract with the Turkish club for two (1+1) more seasons. He averaged 12.8 points, 3.3 rebounds, 3.2 assists, and 1.8 steals per game in 2019–20.

Olympiacos (2020–2021)
On July 8, 2020, Harrison signed with Greek club Olympiacos of the Euroleague.

Türk Telekom (2021–2022)
On July 16, 2021, Harrison signed with Türk Telekom of the Turkish Basketball Super League. Türk Telekom also plays as newcomer in the EuroCup.

Cedevita Olimpija (2022)
On September 15, 2022, he has signed with Cedevita Olimpija of the Slovenian Basketball League.

Kaohsiung Steelers (2022–present)
On December 3, 2022, he signed with Kaohsiung Steelers of the P. League+.

NBA career statistics

Regular season

|-
| style="text-align:left;"| 
| style="text-align:left;"| Charlotte
| 21 || 0 || 4.4 || .263 || .300 || .417 || .7 || .1 || .3 || .0 || .9
|-
| style="text-align:left;"| 
| style="text-align:left;"| Charlotte
| 5 || 0 || 3.4 || .000 || .000 || .500 || .6 || .6 || .0 || .0 || .2
|-
| style="text-align:left;"| 
| style="text-align:left;"| Dallas
| 9 || 3 || 25.9 || .275 || .209 || .765 || 2.7 || 1.2 || 1.0 || .2 || 6.7
|- class="sortbottom"
| style="text-align:center;" colspan="2"| Career
| 35 || 3 || 9.8 || .261 || .218 || .613 || 1.2 || .5 || .4 || .1 || 2.3

Playoffs

|-
| style="text-align:left;"| 2016
| style="text-align:left;"| Charlotte
| 2 || 0 || 3.5 || .000 || .000 || .000 || .5 || .0 || .0 || .0 || .0
|- class="sortbottom"
| style="text-align:center;" colspan="2"| Career
| 2 || 0 || 3.5 || .000 || .000 || .000 || .5 || .0 || .0 || .0 || .0

References

External links

Kentucky Wildcats bio

1994 births
Living people
21st-century African-American sportspeople
African-American basketball players
American expatriate basketball people in Turkey
American men's basketball players
Basketball players from San Antonio
Charlotte Hornets players
Dallas Mavericks players
Delaware 87ers players
Erie BayHawks (2008–2017) players
Galatasaray S.K. (men's basketball) players
Greensboro Swarm players
Kaohsiung Steelers players
Kentucky Wildcats men's basketball players
KK Cedevita Olimpija players
McDonald's High School All-Americans
Oklahoma City Blue players
Olympiacos B.C. players
Parade High School All-Americans (boys' basketball)
Reno Bighorns players
Shooting guards
Small forwards
Türk Telekom B.K. players
American twins
Twin sportspeople
Undrafted National Basketball Association players
United States men's national basketball team players